Hellinsia chrysocomae, also known as the scarce goldenrod plume moth, is a moth of the family Pterophoridae, found in Great Britain, France, Germany, Switzerland and southern Russia.

The larvae feed on the flowers and seeds of ragwort (Jacobaea vulgaris), goldilocks aster (Aster linosyris) and European goldenrod (Solidago virgaurea).

References

External links
 Hants moths

chrysocomae
Moths described in 1875
Plume moths of Asia
Plume moths of Europe
Taxa named by Émile Louis Ragonot